Will Thomas may refer to:

 Will Thomas (basketball) (born 1986), American basketball player
 Will Thomas (bowls) (born 1954), Welsh lawn and indoor bowler
 Will Thomas (novelist) (born 1958), American novelist

See also
 William Thomas (disambiguation)